Ahmir is a group of four male R&B/pop singers who are based out of Boston, Massachusetts. The group is mainly known for their YouTube channel, with over one hundred million views, they are one of the most viewed R&B groups on YouTube. The band was originally named One Love, but changed to Ahmir for trademark reasons.

History

The formation of the band 
The band began their journey in 2002 in Boston as the name "One Luv" or simplified "1Luv". Before the bands' formation, Mr. Jones, the only member originally from Boston, was a Northeastern University graduate, who honed his craft by singing in church choirs. Eventually he networked with Big Mike, who is a New York City native, and a previous member of the respected "The Boys Choir in Harlem", and continued his career at Boston University, majoring in music. They Both decided to put together a male R&B vocal group that not only showcase talent, but a brotherhood. So they set out a search to build the band. KC, who was raised in Rochester New York, had just relocated to Boston in hopes of chasing his dream after taking risks with no formal vocal training other than singing in church choirs and had less financial support and found interest in auditioning for the group after viewing a flyer looking for band mates. Sing-Sing, a Philadelphia native, had passion for music and developed his skill from the Philadelphia High School for the Creative and Performing Arts, which led his path to attend Berklee College of Music where he eventually was approached to become the final addition into the band.

One Luv's popularity rose by creating a buzz performing at various local open-mics and venues across the city. They persisted on getting a record deal from major labels and set out on quest to serenade many record labels, but however it became hard to secure a deal.

The bands' rise to fame 
A few years later, they were discovered by Michael Cheung, who then became their manager and soon released their first hit single in 2006 titled "Welcome To My Party" from their album The Gift under the new stage name "Ahmir". The song peaked at #82 on the Billboard Hot R&B/Hip-Hop Songs chart. And also charted at #19 on the R&B Singles of the Year. Their breakout single from the album "The Wedding Song" went viral over the internet, and was the most requested song to perform at wedding. "The Gift" won an Urban Music Award in New England, USA for Best Album as well the group received another award for "Best R&B Group".

After gaining some notable attention The group performed as contestants on the second season of NBC's America's Got Talent., with celebrity judge Sharon Osbourne considering them as a "Class Act"

In 2008, Ahmir competed on BET's 106 & Park's Wild-out Wednesdays and became the 1st place winners. Shortly after, the band started to generate more buzz by creating visual cover to the music industries most notable songs on YouTube which gained them the label as the "Most popular R&B Group on YouTube" as they were the most watched and subscribed during that time. They also became popular overseas, in particular most successful in Japan.

In the forthcoming years after, Ahmir has used their platforms to be philanthropists, helping communities and participating in benefit concerts and charities around the world and the through the internet.

In 2010, After years of striving to find a home for a record label, They were signed to Robbins Entertainment RED/Sony Music and a few years later they released the single "WAR" which aired on the Top 40 spot across the nation from various radio stations. In 2013, the group made an appearance and performed "WAR" on the Jimmy Fallon show

Ahmir was the winner on the YouTube music show Best Cover Ever on the episode featuring Demi Lovato. The group was awarded with a special performance of "Stone Cold" with Demi Lovato.

In 2017, Ahmir released their commercially self titled album, Ahmir. With the lead single "My Love", which gained airplay on The Music Choice Network as well as a music video for the song which played in rotation on BET Soul.

The bands' decision for a new direction 

With all the growing success of the gentlemen quartet, Ahmir made an announcement on their YouTube channel on May 17, 2018, that Sing Sing would be moving on from the band as he will continue to work on other projects, He states:"In life, there are several points where you look at where you are and stop to evaluate and try to figure out where you've been and where you wanna go. And after some evaluation, I've enjoyed being a member of the group forever...and I figured at this time I would like to spend a little time investing in myself as an artist, and make no mistake these are my guys, these are my brothers in harmony. We made so many stories, so many memories, so much music and we're glad that you've all [the fans] been part of that. Thank you all for everything. The love and support is always going to be there, and this is by no means anything that is so sad because we're all continuing to make some wonderful music from this point, and we just wanted to take some time to share that"The group added to say, they are happy to have had 'Sing' as a member and wish him the best in his new endeavors and will be rooting for him. They also stated that the group has not disbanded, it will continue as a Trio, or possibly seek a new member in the future and would hope the fans will continue to support.

Prior to Sing-Sing's departure, he independently released an Alternative-Rock/R&B solo single titled "Don't Ever" under his new alias named "SING". The music video gained over 5,000 views in over a month.

Solo/Collaborative Ventures 
Months after the hiatus of the band AHMIR, Mr. Jones, influenced by hip-hop, began showcasing his ability to rhyme with Rap music. Releasing 2 music videos for singles on various online streaming platforms ("Demolition Man" & "Twilight Zone - Rest In Power" ), along with displaying skills by participating on a YouTube freestyle challenge produced by Abstract Minor. During the run of the band, Mr. Jones added to his resume some songwriting credits on 8 tracks out of 17 on their 2017 self-titled album. Which later he was able to  collaborate his skills by writing for New Edition/BBD member Mike Bivins' Sporty Rich Enterprises/Apparel album titled Stay Fly and he also provided the vocals, singing the comedic jingle for the "Sporty Rich National 'Bangled' Anthem". Since then in late 2020, he began collaborating with brother Chilla Jones of SMACK/URL fame as a rap/singing duo, Jones Ink, releasing their most notable and popular song in 2021 with Method Man titled "Day Ones", which the music video went viral with over 700,000 views. In 2022 the duo also released multiple independent singles including "Apart", "Voodoo", "Cuban Cigars" and "Wins on Wins"

SING, has continued to pursue his independent solo career releasing an EP Album in 2021 titled "Dirty Truth" with singles such as ""I Need You" and "Traveling Mercies" as well as a standalone single in 2022 "The World Will Know Your Name".

As of 2022, there have been no updates and plans of AHMIR reuniting or new material although a refresher post may appear on their social media of flashbacks or promoting material of their group members respectively.

Albums 

The Gift - 2007
The Best Ahmir Love Songs - 2008
The Covers Collection Vol. 1 - 2009
The Covers Collection Vol. 2 - 2009
The Covers Collection - Special Edition (Japan only) - 2011
The Covers Collection Vol. 2 - Special Edition (Japan only) - 2012
The Covers Collection Vol. 3 - Special Edition (Japan only) - 2012
The Covers Collection Vol. 3.5 - Wedding Collection (Japan only) - 2013
The Covers Collection Vol. 4 - Special Edition (Japan only) - 2013
Summer Collection (Japan only) - 2014
The Covers Collection Vol. 5 - Special Edition (Japan only) - 2014
The Covers Collection Vol. 6 - Special Edition (Japan only) - 2015
Single "War" - 2012
The Covers Collection Vol. 7 - Special Edition (Japan only) - 2016 
The Covers Collection Vol. 8 - Special Edition (Japan only) - 2017
Ahmir - 2017

References

External links 

 
 Ahmir on Youtube
 YHP Interviews Male R&B group, AHMIR
 Most Popular R&B Group on YouTube? Review by Spin or Bin Music
 R&B quartet Ahmir gaining ground while working normal jobs interview Fuse.tv

American pop music groups
Musical groups from Boston